Piotr Zaremba Castle Way is an overpass road in Szczecin, Poland, that is a part of the Voivodeship Road 115. It is one of 4 main roads of Szczecin, connecting the city and Police County with the rest of Poland.

Description 
The Castle Way is 2.4 km (1.5 miles) long and 18 m (59 ft) wide. It consists of the series of overpasses, the bridge over Parnica canal, the overpass over Łasztownia island and the bridge over Oder river. The road has existed leaning north and west to the city centre, and through that, to Dobieszczyn, as well as the south exit leading to Police, and the east exit leading to the municipal neighborhoods of Międzyodrze-Wyspa Pucka and Prawobrzeże.

History 
Castle Way was built in place of Log Bridge that got destroyed during the World War II.
The construction of the road began on 4 February 1978. The north entry road leading to the city center was finished in October 1987, and the north exit road leaning out of the city was finished in 1996, finishing the construction of the Castle Way.

Notes

References

External links 

Bridges in Poland
Streets in Szczecin
Old Town, Szczecin